Michael Scanlan (10 November 1833 – 6 March 1917) was an Irish nationalist, editor, poet and writer. He was known as the "Fenian poet" and is remembered as the author of stirring Irish ballads such as the "Bold Fenian Men" and "The Jackets Green".

Life
He was born in Castlemahon, County Limerick. He emigrated to the United States at fifteen years of age and with his brothers, John and Mortimer, settled in Chicago. They started a sweets (candy) business which became very successful. Scanlan joined the Irish Republican Brotherhood and wrote articles and poems for a number of newspapers.

He supported the Fenian invasion of Canada (31 May 1866), following the leadership of William R. Roberts, and was a member of a body known as the Senate.  After the failure of that enterprise he was appointed editor of a new newspaper, the Irish Republic on which he worked with former Irish tenant-right activist and fellow IRB exile David Bell.

In the Irish Republic Scanlon and Bell promoted the physical-force Fenianism, while disparaging the general clericalism and pro-Democratic-Party leanings of rival Irish-American papers. The Irish Republic supported the Radical Republican agenda for Reconstruction, black suffrage and equal rights. 

After the Irish Republic ceased publication in 1873, Scanlon continued writing for Irish and American newspapers. He later became a senior official in the American administration in Washington. In 1887 he was appointed chief of the Bureau of Statistics in the State Department. He retired in 1912.

He died, aged eighty-four years, in the hospital of St. Mary of Nazareth in Chicago, after having been ill for a week. He was survived by a son, Judge Kickham Scanlan, and three daughters.

References

1833 births
1917 deaths
19th-century Irish poets
Writers from County Limerick
Irish emigrants to the United States (before 1923)
Members of the Irish Republican Brotherhood